Thomas or Tom Bevan may refer to:
 Thomas Bevan (missionary) (c. 1796–1819), Welsh Christian missionary
 Thomas Bevan (priest) (1800–1863), archdeacon of St David's
 Thomas Bevan (cricketer) (1900–1942), English cricketer and British Army officer
 Tom Bevan (writer) (1868–1937), British writer of boys' adventure stories
 Tom Bevan (publisher), American publisher of RealClearPolitics
 Tom Bevan (cricketer) (born 1999), Welsh cricketer 
 Sid Bevan (Thomas Sidney Bevan, 1877–1933), Welsh rugby union player